Philadelphia is a city in Loudon County, Tennessee, United States. Its population was 656 at the 2010 census. It is included in the Knoxville Metropolitan Statistical Area.

History

Philadelphia was founded in the early 1820s by William Knox and Jacob Pearson.  The town initially grew quickly and prospered as a center of business in the Sweetwater Valley.  By the mid-19th century, Philadelphia had two general stores, a tanning yard, a stillhouse, and a hotel.

On October 20, 1863, during the Civil War, two Confederate cavalry regiments attacked and routed a Union brigade at Philadelphia while conducting maneuvers following the Battle of Chickamauga.  The Confederates captured 700 soldiers, 6 cannon, and 50 supply wagons.

On October 20, 2001, there was a reenactment of the events in 1863.

Geography
Philadelphia is located at  (35.678236, -84.401430). The town is situated along Sweetwater Creek, which empties into the Watts Bar Lake impoundment of the Tennessee River a few miles to the north.

Philadelphia is concentrated around an area northwest of the junction of U.S. Route 11 (Lee Highway), which connects Philadelphia with Loudon to the north and Sweetwater to the south, and State Route 323 (Pond Creek Road), which connects Philadelphia with Interstate 75 to the west.

Demographics

2020 census

As of the 2020 United States census, there were 607 people, 278 households, and 213 families residing in the city.

2000 census
As of the census of 2000, there were 533 people, 205 households, and 150 families residing in the city. The population density was 333.5 people per square mile (128.6/km2). There were 222 housing units at an average density of 138.9 per square mile (53.6/km2). The racial makeup of the city was 92.87% White, 4.13% African American, 0.75% Native American, 0.19% Asian, and 2.06% from two or more races. Hispanic or Latino of any race were 0.38% of the population.

There were 205 households, out of which 31.2% had children under the age of 18 living with them, 60.0% were married couples living together, 10.2% had a female householder with no husband present, and 26.8% were non-families. 22.0% of all households were made up of individuals, and 11.2% had someone living alone who was 65 years of age or older. The average household size was 2.60 and the average family size was 3.09.

In the city, the population was spread out, with 26.3% under the age of 18, 6.6% from 18 to 24, 30.4% from 25 to 44, 22.7% from 45 to 64, and 14.1% who were 65 years of age or older. The median age was 36 years. For every 100 females, there were 97.4 males. For every 100 females age 18 and over, there were 99.5 males.

The median income for a household in the city was $31,563, and the median income for a family was $39,792. Males had a median income of $30,875 versus $14,318 for females. The per capita income for the city was $12,239. About 13.1% of families and 17.3% of the population were below the poverty line, including 22.3% of those under age 18 and 15.9% of those age 65 or over.

Education
Philadelphia is served by Loudon County Schools. Philadelphia pupils are zoned to the Philadelphia School (kindergarten to grade 8) and Loudon High School (grades 9-12) in Loudon.

References

External links

Municipal Technical Advisory Service entry for Philadelphia — information on local government, elections, and link to charter

Cities in Loudon County, Tennessee
Cities in Tennessee
Knoxville metropolitan area
Populated places established in 1822
1822 establishments in Tennessee